Colegio Pestalozzi is a German international school in Belgrano, Buenos Aires. It is governed by the Asociación Cultural Pestalozzi. It serves kindergarten through secondary school: Colegio Pestalozzi offers elementary and secondary education as well as an "initial level" for children from two to five years.

It was founded in 1934 by Dr. Ernesto Alemann, an Argentine of Swiss origin. It was founded in opposition to the Nazi regime that was prevalent in Germany at the time, as a consequence of the incoming migration from Germany into Argentina. The school welcomed many pedagogues that were fleeing Germany for political reasons, as well as many German-Jewish, mostly secular, students. Colegio Pesalozzi houses the first Stolpersteine in Buenos Aires (and the first ourside of Europe), a plate that commemorates the victims of Nazism.

Alemann's aim was to create a place for free and humanistic education in accordance with the thoughts of the Swiss pedagogue Johann Heinrich Pestalozzi, where the values of the central European culture and the German language could be upheld.

References

External links
  Pestalozzi-Schule
  Pestalozzi-Schule

European-Argentine culture in Buenos Aires
International schools in Buenos Aires
Buenos Aires
Private schools in Argentina
1934 establishments in Argentina
Educational institutions established in 1934